Violence is a 1947 American drama film noir directed by Jack Bernhard and starring Nancy Coleman, Michael O'Shea and Sheldon Leonard.

Plot
Undercover reporter Ann Mason develops amnesia after infiltrating a neo-fascist group.

Cast
 Nancy Coleman as Ann Dwire, alias Ann Mason
 Michael O'Shea as Steve Fuller
 Sheldon Leonard as Fred Stalk
 Peter Whitney as Joker
 Emory Parnell as True Dawson
 Pierre Watkin as Ralph Borden
 Frank Reicher as Pop, apartment concierge
 Cay Forrester as Sally Donahue
 John Hamilton as Doctor in Chicago
 Richard Irving as Protest Rally Orator
 Carole Donne as Beth Taffel, Borden's secretary
 Jimmy Clark as Joe Donahue
 William Gould as Mr. X

References

External links
 
 
 
 Violence at DVD Beaver (includes images)

1947 films
1940s thriller drama films
American black-and-white films
Film noir
Monogram Pictures films
American thriller drama films
1947 drama films
Films directed by Jack Bernhard
1940s English-language films
1940s American films